Graham Leigh (born May 10, 1975) is a former American football quarterback who played for the Birmingham Thunderbolts of the XFL.

References

Further reading
 
 
 

1975 births
Living people
American football quarterbacks
Birmingham Thunderbolts players
New Mexico Lobos football players
Pacific Tigers football players
Sportspeople from Mesa, Arizona
Sportspeople from Omaha, Nebraska